Lexington National Cemetery is a United States National Cemetery located in the city of Lexington, Kentucky. Administered by the United States Department of Veterans Affairs, it encompasses less than 4050 square meters (1 acre), and as of 2014 had approximately 1,700 interments. It is closed to new interments.

History
Lexington National Cemetery was originally a military section of the Lexington Cemetery which was first used to inter American Civil War casualties in 1861. After the war, several makeshift battlefield cemeteries had their remains moved to Lexington. In 1863, the lot was officially designated a National Cemetery, and in 1867, an additional 1500 square meters (0.38 acres) were purchased by the federal government to increase the lot to its current size.

Lexington National Cemetery was listed on National Register of Historic Places in 1998.

References

External links

 National Cemetery Administration
 Lexington National Cemetery
 
 
 

Cemeteries on the National Register of Historic Places in Kentucky
Kentucky in the American Civil War
National Register of Historic Places in Lexington, Kentucky
United States national cemeteries
Tourist attractions in Lexington, Kentucky
Protected areas of Fayette County, Kentucky
Historic American Landscapes Survey in Kentucky
1868 establishments in Kentucky